The relaxin receptors are a subclass of four closely related G protein-coupled receptors (GPCR) that bind relaxin peptide hormones.

Below is list of human relaxin receptors, their endogenous peptide hormones, and what downstream enzymes are activated or inhibited by the receptor.

See also
 Relaxin family peptide hormones
 Insulin/IGF/Relaxin family
 Relaxin/insulin-like family peptide receptor 1

References

External links

G protein-coupled receptors